Jan Verner (born 3 March 1951) is a former international speedway rider from the Czech Republic.

Speedway career 
Verner reached the final of the Speedway World Championship in the 1977 Individual Speedway World Championship.

He rode in the top tier of British Speedway from 1978-1982, riding for various clubs.

World final appearances

Individual World Championship
 1977 –  Gothenburg, Ullevi – 15th – 1pt
 1978 -  London, Wembley Stadium - 12th - 5pts

World Pairs Championship
 1977 -  Manchester, Hyde Road (with Jiří Štancl) - 4th - 17pts (6)
 1978 -  Chorzów, Silesian Stadium (with Jiří Štancl) - 4th - 18pts
 1981 -  Chorzów, Silesian Stadium (with Aleš Dryml Sr.) - 4th - 18pts

World Team Cup
 1977 -  Wrocław, Olympic Stadium (with Jiří Štancl / Václav Verner / Aleš Dryml) - 3rd - 23pts (5)
 1978 -  Landshut, Ellermühle Stadium (with Jiří Štancl / Václav Verner / Aleš Dryml) - 4th - 16+2pts (5)

World Longtrack Championship
 1976 –  Marianske Lazne 19th 0pts
 1977 –  Aalborg 14th 4pts
 1978 –  Mühldorf 13th 9pts

Individual Ice Speedway World Championship
1972 –  Nässjö 14th 4pts
1973 –  Inzell 11th 11pts
1975 –  Moscow 13th 8pts
1976 –  Assen 9th 12pts
1977 –  Inzell 6th 16pts
1985 -  Assen, 9th

Family
His brother Václav Verner and his cousin Miloslav Verner were also international speedway riders.

References 

1951 births
Living people
Czech speedway riders
Cradley Heathens riders
Exeter Falcons riders
Swindon Robins riders
Sportspeople from Mladá Boleslav